Iridomyrmex nudipes is a species of ant in the genus Iridomyrmex. Described by Heterick and Shattuck in 2011, the workers of the species are diurnal foragers, and have only been recorded in New South Wales.

Etymology
The name derives from the Latin language, which translates as 'naked foot', nudus meaning 'naked' and pes meaning 'foot'.

References

Iridomyrmex
Hymenoptera of Australia
Insects described in 2011